Gondomar may refer to:

Places
Gondomar, Portugal, a city and municipality in Portugal
 Gondomar (São Cosme), Valbom e Jovim, a civil parish in the city
Gondomar, Pontevedra, a town in Galicia, Spain

People
Diego Sarmiento de Acuña, conde de Gondomar (1567–1626), Spanish diplomat
Pedro Sarmiento, 3rd Marquis of Mancera (c. 1625–1715) and Count of Gondomar, Grandee of Spain

Other uses
Gondomar S.C., a football club based in Gondomar, Portugal